José García Molina (born 29 December 1969) is a Spanish professor and politician from Podemos who served as Second Vice President of the Junta of Communities of Castilla–La Mancha from August 2017 to July 2019.

References

1969 births
Members of the 9th Cortes of Castilla–La Mancha
Podemos (Spanish political party) politicians
Living people